Jeffrey Mark Toews (born November 4, 1957) is a former NFL offensive tackle and guard who played seven seasons with the Miami Dolphins. In college, Toews played for the University of Washington and was named to the 1977 All-Pacific-8 Conference football team, 1978 All-Pacific-10 Conference football team, and 1978 College Football All-America Team.  He was selected by the Dolphins in the second round of the 1979 NFL Draft. He is the younger brother of former Pittsburgh Steelers linebacker Loren Toews.

1957 births
Living people
American football offensive tackles
Washington Huskies football players
Miami Dolphins players